The Wild Eye is a 1967 Italian drama film directed by Paolo Cavara. It was entered into the 5th Moscow International Film Festival.

Cast
 Philippe Leroy as Paolo
 Delia Boccardo as Barbara Bates
 Gabriele Tinti as Valentino
 Giorgio Gargiullo as Rossi
 Luciana Angiolillo as Mrs. Davis
 Lars Bloch as John Bates
 Gianni Bongioanni as The Hunter
 Tullio Marini as Ruggero

References

External links
 

1967 films
1967 drama films
Italian drama films
1960s Italian-language films
Films directed by Paolo Cavara
Films about film directors and producers
Films about journalists
1960s Italian films